

Max Reinwald (1 September 1903 – 8 June 1969) was a general  in the Wehrmacht of Nazi Germany who commanded the 362nd Infantry Division during World War II. He was a recipient of the  Knight's Cross of the Iron Cross with Oak Leaves.

Awards and decorations
 Iron Cross (1939) 2nd Class (24 October 1939) & 1st Class (14 June 1940)
 German Cross in Gold on 19 December 1941 as Oberleutnant in the 1./Infanterie-Regiment 19
 Knight's Cross of the Iron Cross with Oak Leaves
 Knight's Cross on 29 February 1944 as Oberstleutnant of the Reserves and commander of Grenadier-Regiment 19
 702nd Oak Leaves on 18 January 1945 as Oberst of the Reserves and commander of Grenadier-Regiment 19

References

Citations

Bibliography

 
 

1903 births
1969 deaths
People from Regensburg (district)
Major generals of the German Army (Wehrmacht)
People from the Kingdom of Bavaria
Recipients of the Gold German Cross
Recipients of the Knight's Cross of the Iron Cross with Oak Leaves
Military personnel from Bavaria
German Army officers of World War II